Brunvoll is a surname. Notable people with the surname include:

Gunnar Brunvoll (1924–1999), Norwegian impresario and opera administrator
Jonas Brunvoll Jr. (1920–1982), Norwegian opera singer and actor
Jonas Brunvoll Sr. (1894–1969), Norwegian advertisement manager, editor and politician 
Mari Kvien Brunvoll (born 1984), Norwegian folk and jazz singer